Karri Käyhkö (16 December 1937 – 7 March 2020) was a Finnish freestyle swimmer. He competed at the 1956 Summer Olympics and the 1960 Summer Olympics.

References

External links
 

1937 births
2020 deaths
Finnish male freestyle swimmers
Olympic swimmers of Finland
Swimmers at the 1956 Summer Olympics
Swimmers at the 1960 Summer Olympics
Sportspeople from Espoo